Latifa School for Girls was founded in 1982 by Sheikh Maktoum. It was headed by Tim Charlton, who also founded Dubai College in 1978.

External links

www.dubaifaqs.com/latifa-school-for-girls.php - Dubai FAQs information.

International schools in the United Arab Emirates
Schools in Dubai